Heydar Aliyev Order is the supreme order of Azerbaijan. The order was ratified by legislation of Azerbaijan Republic by the Decree No. 896-IIQ on 22 April 2005. The Heydar Aliyev Order is given to the citizens of the Republic of Azerbaijan for special contributions to the prosperity, greatness and glory of Azerbaijan; for courage and bravery displayed in defense of the Motherland and state interests of the Azerbaijan Republic. The Order is given to the President of Azerbaijan according to status.

Foreign nationals
“Heydar Aliyev” Order is given to foreign nationals for the following services:

special contributions to Azerbaijan;
special contributions to implementation work of Azerbaijani idea, strengthening solidarity of Azerbaijanis in the whole world;
special contributions to mending of political, economical, scientific and cultural fences of Azerbaijan with other countries;
star and chain with the image of sword are assigned to “Heydar Aliyev” Order in accordance with paragraph No.32 of clause No. 109 the Constitution of Azerbaijan Republic (it falls within the competence of the President).

“Heydar Aliyev” Order is pinned to the left side of the chest. If there are any other orders and medals, “Heydar Aliyev” Order follows them.

Description
“Heydar Aliyev” Order includes the star, symbol and the order chain. Two variants of the star and the chain are made-with and without the sword. The order is made of 525 carat bronze weighing 533,29 grams, 999 carat silver weighing 3,89 grams, 750 carat gold weighing 57,42 grams, 999 carat gold weighing 6,42 grams, 8 brilliants weighing 0,83 carats, 224 brilliants weighing 5,34 carats, 67 brilliants weighing 1 carat (total number of used brilliants is 299).

Eight-pointed star of the order, provided to be worn on the chest, is made of silver. The ends of the star are made in the form of flower petals. Distance between the opposite ends of the star is 82 mm. A plate with wavy circle is placed on the surface of the star. This plate on the star with sword is mounted on two crossed swords passing through the four ends of the star. The swords are made of silver colored with gold. Each sword's length is 82 mm and width is 4 mm. A brilliant is mounted on the handle of each sword. Bas-relief of Heydar Aliyev is portrayed on a round medallion located on a polished plate, which is located on the plate with wavy circle. The medallion is made of 750 carat gold. The medallion is surrounded by an inner ring with 42 brilliants on it. The words “Heydar Aliyev” are written with golden letters on the top of a middle ring covered with red enamel and surrounding the inner ring. The bottom of the middle ring is adorned with three brilliants within a diamond-shaped ornament, there are two arched stripes covered with green enamel between them. The middle ring is surrounded by the external blue-colored ring with wavy circle; 20 brilliants are mounted on it within triangular engravings. Badge of “Heydar Aliyev” Order, which is worn around the neck and hang down the chest, consists of a base with a rectangular ornament covered with white enamel. Brilliants are mounted on elements of the ornament made in the forms of stars covered with red enamel. The rectangular ornament covered with blue enamel is located on the surface of the basis. Brilliants are mounted to each of four ends of the ornament. The basis and the ornament located on it are made of silver colored with gold. A plate made of 750 carat gold is mounted to the central part of the badge. The plate is colored with dark red color. The bas-relief of Heydar Aliyev made of 750 carat gold is located in the center of the plate. The bas-relief is surrounded by a frame of a regular geometric shape in the form of two crossed squares. 112 brilliants are mounted on the surface of the squares. The frame is made of silver colored with gold. The badge’s height is 67 mm, and the width is-67 mm. The chain of the order consists of 15 elements, arranged in a certain order. These elements are:

Two decorative plates located to the left and right of the chain, consisting of crossed flags covered with blue, red and green enamels. National Flag of Azerbaijan Republic is located in the center of plates.
Two quadrangular ornaments located to the left and right of the chain covered with white enamel. A medallion surrounded by an ornament covered with red enamel is located in the center. A monogram with initials of Heydar Aliyev is located in then center. Two crossed swords are located on the chain with sword, under the medallion.
Three plates with the image of the National Emblem of Azerbaijan Republic are located to the left, right and on the top of the chain.

Mentioned elements are mounted to the large chain with plates decorated with 112 brilliants (16 plates with 7 brilliants on each). The rear side of the order is polished and has an engraved order number and an element to wear it on.

Recipients

The order is awarded rarely. Following persons were awarded the order until the beginning of 03.09.2014:

 : İlham Aliyev - (President of Republic of Azerbaijan) -   28.04.2005.
 : İhsan Doğramacı - (Turkish doctor-pediatrician, public figure) - 29.04.2005.<ref>{{cite news|title="İ.Ə.Doğramacının "Heydər Əliyev" ordeni ilə təltif edilməsi haqqında" Azərbaycan Respublikası Prezidentinin 29 aprel 2005-ci il tarixli, 787 nömrəli Sərəncamı |publisher=e-qanun.az |url=http://e-qanun.az/print.php?internal=view&target=1&docid=9581&doctype=0 |date=29 March 2005 |url-status=dead |archiveurl=https://web.archive.org/web/20120305154136/http://e-qanun.az/print.php?internal=view&target=1&docid=9581&doctype=0 |archivedate=5 March 2012 }}</ref>
 : Jacques Chirac - (President of France) - 29.01.2007.
 : Mstislav Rostropovich - (Russian cellist and conductor) - 27.03.2007.
 : Viktor Yushchenko - (President of Ukraine) - 22.05.2008.
 : Tahir Salahov - (Azerbaijani painter and draughtsman) 27.11.2008.
 : Jaber Al-Ahmad Al-Jaber Al-Sabah - (Emir and thirteenth Sheikh of Kuwait) - 14.06.2009.
 : Lech Kaczyński - (President of Poland) - 02.07.2009.
 : Valdis Zatlers - (President of Latvia) - 10.08.2009.
 : Traian Băsescu - (President of Romania) - 18.04.2011.
 : Georgi Parvanov - (President of Bulgaria) - 14.11.2011.
 : Emomalii Rahmon - (President of Tajikistan) - 11.07.2012.
 : Arif Malikov - (Azerbaijani and Soviet composer) - 13.09.2013.
 : Abdullah Gül - (11th President of Turkey) - 12.11.2013.
 : Viktor Yanukovych - (President of Ukraine) - 17.11.2013.
 : Recep Tayyip Erdoğan - (12th President of Turkey) - 03.09.2014.Presidency of the Republic of Turkey (Photo)
 : Mehriban Aliyeva - (Chairman of the Organizing Committee of the First European Games "Baku-2015") - 29.06.2015.
 : Alexander Lukashenko - (President of Belarus) - 28.11.2016.
 : Zeynab Khanlarova - (People's Artist of the USSR and Azerbaijan) - 26.12.2016.
 : Nursultan Nazarbayev - (President of Kazakhstan) - 03.04.2017.
 : Sergio Mattarella - (President of Italy) - 18.07.2018.
 : Ramiz Mehdiyev - (President of the Azerbaijan National Academy of Sciences) - 23.10.2019.
 : Khoshbakht Yusifzadeh - (First Vice-President of the State Oil Company of Azerbaijan Republic) - 13.01.2020.
 : Polad Bülbüloğlu - (Ambassador of Azerbaijan to Russia)'' - 03.02.2020.

References 

 
Orders, decorations, and medals of Azerbaijan
Awards established in 2005
2005 establishments in Azerbaijan